Phyllonorycter macrantherella is a moth of the family Gracillariidae. It is known from Armenia, Georgia, Daghestan, Turkey and Ukraine.

The larvae feed on Quercus macranthera. They probably mine the leaves of their host plant.

References

macrantherella
Moths of Europe
Moths of Asia
Moths described in 1961